Lin Yi-hao (born January 2, 1991 in Taiwan) is a professional baseball pitcher for the Fubon Guardians of the Chinese Professional Baseball League (CPBL}. He played for the Yomiuri Giants in Japan's Nippon Professional Baseball.

Career
Lin began his career by signing with the Yomiuri Giants of Nippon Professional Baseball in 2008. He played for the club from 2010 to 2013 before joining the EDA Rhinos, later rebranded as the Fubon Guardians of the Chinese Professional Baseball League. Lin has pitched with the Guardians in every season from 2014 to 2020.

External links

NPB.com

1991 births
Living people
Taiwanese expatriate baseball players in Japan
Yomiuri Giants players
2013 World Baseball Classic players
Asian Games medalists in baseball
Baseball players at the 2010 Asian Games
EDA Rhinos players
Fubon Guardians players
Medalists at the 2010 Asian Games
Asian Games silver medalists for Chinese Taipei
People from Hsinchu